John Gayer or John Gayre may refer to:

John  Gayer (MP) (by 1532-71), English MP
 John Gayer (Lord Mayor of London) (fl. 1646)
John Gayer (died 1711), English governor of Bombay

See also
Gayer (surname)